Twofour is a British television and digital media group founded in 1989 by Charles Wace, a former BBC news producer, and Christopher Slade, a BBC presenter. With its headquarters in Plymouth, Twofour has offices in London and Los Angeles.

In June 2015, Twofour Group was acquired by ITV Studios.

Melanie Leach was named CEO in summer 2014. In Autumn 2019, Leach stepped down, and Tim Carter was appointed CEO of Twofour and the ITV company Multistory Media.

Divisions

Twofour
Twofour supplies programming to channels including BBC, ITV, Channel 4, Channel 5, and UKTV.

Twofour was awarded Broadcast's "Best Indie Production Company" title in 2010 and 2014, with titles including The Jump (Channel 4), The Real Marigold Hotel (BBC One/BBC Two) and  This Time Next Year (ITV) and Channel 5's longest running series, The Hotel Inspector.

The company produces ob-doc and fixed rig shows such as Channel 4's Educating Yorkshire, Educating the East End and 2011's Educating Essex.

Twofour has produced a range of adventure documentaries such as Harry's Arctic Heroes for BBC One and Harry's Mountain Heroes for ITV, both featuring Prince Harry and a group of wounded soldiers as they attempt to reach the North Pole and Mount Everest respectively and “You’ve Gotta Run” for ITV and Peace Point TV as the students run away and DeeDee is the running teacher.

Twofour Rights
Twofour Rights was the distribution arm of TwoFour. Launched in 2012, they brought TwoFours programmes to the international marketplace.

In 2021, TwoFour's parent company ITV Studios, merged TwoFour Rights into ITV Studios Distribution.

Programmes produced by Twofour

2023

2021

2018

2017

2016

2015

2014

2013

2012

2011

Awards
This Time Next Year was named the fastest selling format in the world in 2016, and secured a C21 award and a Realscreen Award.

The Real Marigold Hotel won a Rose d'Or award in 2016. The series was moved to BBC One for its second series.

Educating Yorkshire won a National Television Award, RTS Award, Broadcast Award for Best Documentary, IVCA Award, a BAFTA Craft award and two BAFTA Television nominations.

Twofour held the title Best Indie Production Company in 2010 and 2014, and secured 1st place in Televisual Magazine's True Indie Survey 2013.  

The company has been awarded several IVCA and RTS awards. In 2013, triple BAFTA-nominated Educating Essex won a Broadcast Award for Best Documentary Series.

References

External links

ITV (TV network)
Mass media companies established in 1989
Television production companies of the United Kingdom
2015 mergers and acquisitions